This is a listing of the horses that finished in either first, second, or third place and the number of starters in the Conniver Stakes (1969-present), an American Thoroughbred Stakes race for fillies and mares three years-old and up at 7 furlongs run on dirt at Laurel Park Racecourse in Laurel, Maryland.

References

 The Conniver Stakes at Pedigree Query

Lists of horse racing results
Laurel Park Racecourse